Nahrin is a town in Baghlan Province in north-eastern Afghanistan.

It is the capital of Nahrin District.

See also 
Baghlan Province

References

External links
Satellite map at Maplandia.com

Populated places in Baghlan Province